Paramount Defenses is a privately held American Cyber Security company that develops cyber security solutions to "help organizations secure their foundational Microsoft Active Directory deployments".

The company was founded  in 2006 by Sanjay Tandon, former Microsoft Program Manager for Active Directory Security.

The company is headquartered in Newport Beach, California and led by its founder. It operates under the guidance of an Advisory Board that amongst others includes Karen Worstell, former Microsoft Chief Information Security Officer (CISO) and Donald Codling, former Unit Chief Liaison from the Federal Bureau of Investigation (FBI) Cyber Division to the Department of Homeland Security National Cyber Security Division.

The company produced The Paramount Brief, an executive summary, declassified  in 2016, that describes a serious cyber security risk that potentially impacts the foundational cyber security of 85% of organizations worldwide.

History
Paramount Defenses was founded in 2006.

In 2013, the United States Patent Office awarded its founder a cyber security patent governing the accurate determination of effective access in information systems.

References

External links
 

Active Directory
Companies based in Newport Beach, California
Computer security software companies
Computer security software
Software companies established in 2006
Software companies of the United States